Ellis Robert Kolchin (April 18, 1916 – October 30, 1991) was an American mathematician at Columbia University. Kolchin earned a doctorate in mathematics from Columbia University in 1941 under supervision of Joseph Ritt. He was awarded a Guggenheim Fellowship in 1954 and 1961.

Kolchin worked on differential algebra and its relation to differential equations, and founded the modern theory of linear algebraic groups. His doctoral students include Azriel Rosenfeld and Irving Adler.

See also 
 Kolchin topology
 Lie–Kolchin theorem
 Picard–Vessiot theory

Publications

References

External links 

 

1916 births
1991 deaths
20th-century American mathematicians
Columbia University alumni
Columbia University faculty
Institute for Advanced Study visiting scholars